The Council of Europe Film Award (FACE) is presented at the Istanbul International Film Festival by the Council of Europe to the director whose entry to the festival raises public awareness and interest in human rights issues and promotes a better understanding of their significance.

Philosophy

The presentation of the FACE award is destined to honour an artistic or documentary film that raises the profile of human rights in accordance with the values of the Council of Europe and the principles it stands for: individual freedom, political liberty and the rule of law. The philosophy underlying the award's creation is the belief in the ability of film to transport its own message of human rights, tolerance and social inclusion to a wide audience. Cinema is not only an important expression of European culture, but it is also a compass that can help to map out a route towards the Europe of the future – one that celebrates diversity and difference, that promotes equal opportunities for all its citizens, and that challenges abuse and intolerance.

Procedure and prize

The contribution winning the FACE award is selected by a jury from the entries in the "Human Rights in Cinema" section of the festival. This includes both documentaries and feature films investigating social change and individual dramas.

The FACE award consists of a sculpture in bronze (created by Freddy Ruhlman, entitled "Spirale de l'élévation") and a cash prize of 10000 €, which is offered in association with Eurimages, the Council of Europe fund for the co-production, distribution, and exhibition of European cinematographic works.

On 17 April 2010, Maud de Boer-Buquicchio, Deputy Secretary-General of the Council of Europe, presented the fourth Film Award of the Council of Europe (FACE) to  Scandar Copti and Yaron Shani, during the closing ceremony of the 29th  international film festival in Istanbul. "The reason why we decided to team up with the prestigious Istanbul Film Festival is simple: while we believe that films cannot change the world, they can make us reflect and challenge us to change the world ourselves. This is all the more true when human rights are at stake", she said.

In 2009, Maud de Boer-Buquicchio presented the third Film Award of the Council of Europe (FACE) to Marco Bechis on 18 April.

The 2008 Council of Europe Film Award was presented on April 19, by Maud de Boer-Buquicchio, Deputy Secretary General of the Council of Europe.

On 14 April 2007, the first Council of Europe Film Award was presented by Thomas Hammarberg, the Council of Europe Human Rights Commissioner, in the name of the Secretary General of the Council of Europe, Terry Davis. Since then, the FACE award has been established as an annual collaboration between the International Istanbul Film Festival and the Council of Europe.

The Council of Europe and the Istanbul International Film Festival

Turkey, a long-standing member of the 47 nation Council of Europe, has a long and proud tradition of film making. Between 1950 and 1970 it topped the league of the world’s most prolific film industries. Many of the films have reflected the changes in Turkish society, holding up a mirror to topics as diverse as domestic violence and the role of women, the problems of migration from the countryside and poverty in the cities. These films have served to boost inclusiveness and respect for human rights.

At the same time, Turkish filmmakers have suffered the same problems in recent years as their colleagues elsewhere; the drying up of funding, increased competition from the big players, and the challenges of new technology. The Council of Europe manages Eurimages, the body that funds the co-production and distribution of films and fosters co-operation between professionals. It is also home to the European Audiovisual Observatory, the only centre of its kind to gather and circulate information on the audiovisual industry in Europe, including cinema, television, and radio.

Award holders

 2010: Ajami by Scandar Copti and Yaron Shani. The decision of the Human Rights Jury was announced by its President Marco Bechis, winner of FACE in 2009 for Birdwatchers, who described Ajami as an "original tale of a multilayered society where different religions, beliefs, traditions and interests have to co-exist". "The two directors have skilfully found the right cinematographic language to tell this powerful story," the jury said. Ajami takes its name from a multi-ethnic neighbourhood in Jaffa, Israel. The film starts with a revenge killing, a case of mistaken identity whose repercussions lead to tragic results. The Jury Special Mention went to Philippe Van Leeuw for "The Day God Walked Away".
 2009: Birdwatchers by Marco Bechis: "In today’s expanding world, respect for native populations and minorities is essential. By conveying this important message in a very well constructed story, Birdwatchers describes the complexities of changing society"; Jury members also decided to reward Nandita Das with a Special Jury Prize, for her film Firaaq which "courageously deals with the highly sensitive theme of religious intolerance and sectarian strife: showing its terrible consequences, Firaaq also conveys a message of hope and demonstrates that people can make choices."
 2008: Mang Shan / Blind Mountain by Li Yang "for its powerful message against all violence, no matter its form to women all over the world, because this message is both universal and timeless." Blind Mountain tells the story of a young student travelling to the north of China in pursuit of employment. The girl is abducted and sold as bride in an isolated village located deep in the mountains. Through her story, the film highlights the torment caused by human trafficking and violence against women.

 2007: Bamako / The Court, directed by Abderrahmane Sissako, a Malian director, whose film explored the exploitation of Africa by other world powers. Bamako shows a community "court" where the people of Mali can find justice. "Equality, full respect for human rights and the active involvement of ordinary citizens are needed to ensure social justice and are necessary for any social and economic development. For this reason, the jury has decided to award the FACE award to Bamako / The Court"

References

External links

Council of Europe homepage
Council of Europe Film Award page
Istanbul International Film Festival homepage
Eurimages homepage

Council of Europe
European film awards
European human rights awards